Mexiclan is a Latin rap duo composed of Sem Vargas and Marco Antonio Muñoz. Their first self-titled album was released by Univision Records on January 13, 2004, and that same year the album charted on Billboard's Top Latin Albums chart peaking at number 51.

Discography
2004: Mexiclan
2005: Mexiclanos Unidos
2006: El Nuevo Imperio

External review
Detailed Review of Mexiclan Album

References

External links 
[ Allmusic.com: Mexiclan]
Mexiclan Official Website

Mexican musical groups